The 2010 CONCACAF Women's World Cup Qualifying was an international women's football tournament held in Mexico from 28 October–8 November 2010. The eight national teams involved in the tournament were required to register a squad of 20 players, including two goalkeepers. Only players in these squads were eligible to take part in the tournament.

The position listed for each player is per the official squad list published by CONCACAF. The age listed for each player is on 28 October 2010, the first day of the tournament. The numbers of caps and goals listed for each player do not include any matches played after the start of tournament. The nationality for each club reflects the national association (not the league) to which the club is affiliated.

Group A

Canada
The squad was announced on 27 October 2010.

Coach:  Carolina Morace

Guyana
Coach: Mark Rodrigues

Mexico
Head coach: Leonardo Cuéllar

Trinidad and Tobago
Head coach: Jamaal Shabazz

Group B

Costa Rica
The squad was announced on 21 October 2010.

Head coach: Randall Chacón

Guatemala
Head coach: Raúl Fernando Calderón

Haiti
Head coach:  Augusto Moura de Oliveira

United States
The squad was announced on 13 October 2010.

Head coach:  Pia Sundhage

References

Squads
2010